Şahhüseynli (also, Şahhüseynlü, Shakhsunni, Shakhsyunlyu, and Shakhsyunnyu) is a village and municipality in the Zardab Rayon of Azerbaijan.  It has a population of 1,371.

References 

Populated places in Zardab District